Lower Upham is a small village in Hampshire, England, situated north-west of Bishop's Waltham on the B2177.

Governance
The village is part of the civil parish of Upham and is part of the Owslebury and Curdridge ward of the City of Winchester non-metropolitan district of Hampshire County Council.

Facilities
Lower Upham has a pub - the Alma Inn, the New Millennium Village Hall and a small private airfield that is the home of Solent Flight, a flying school.  Other businesses in the village include a large motor home and caravan sales centre.

References

Villages in Hampshire